Faustin Edmond Wirkus (16 November 1896 – 8 October 1945) was an American marine stationed in Haiti during the United States occupation of Haiti (1915–1934). He was reputedly crowned Faustin II, King of La Gonâve, a Haitian island west of Hispaniola, by Queen Ti Memenne of La Gonâve on 18 July 1926, and co-ruled until he was transferred by the United States Marine Corps to the United States mainland in 1929.

Early life

According to an official biography, Wirkus was born in 1896 in Rypin (Congress Poland, in the Russian Empire) a small town now in Poland, however, numerous ship passenger lists (records of the U.S. Customs Service) show his correct birth place as Pittston, Pennsylvania. He and his parents settled in Dupont, Pennsylvania, a coal mining community northwest of Wilkes-Barre, where he was raised. At the age of 11, he started sorting coal in Pittston.

Military career

Wirkus enlisted in the US Marine Corps in 1915 and served in the 1st Advance Base Brigade in Haiti and rose to the rank of corporal in 1918 then to gunnery sergeant in 1920.  During his service in the Marine Corps, he was promoted to a lieutenant in the Garde d'Haiti, commanding a squad of native troops on La Gonâve. After rescuing a young woman in trouble, he found out that she was Queen Timemenne of La Gonâve. He was welcomed by the population as Timemenne had told them how kind he was to her, and in part, due to the unusual circumstance that he had the same first name as the former emperor of Haiti, Faustin Soulouque, later known as Faustin I ("Faustin the First"), who died in 1867. Somewhat bizarrely, the natives proclaimed him Faustin II in a Voodoo ritual and he ruled jointly with Queen Timemenne for three years. He became known for dispensing ready but gentle justice.

Later life
Wirkus left the Marine Corps in 1931 as a gunnery sergeant. He returned to the Marine Corps in 1939 as a recruiting specialist where he rose to the rank of marine gunner. In 1944 he was appointed an aviation gunnery instructor at the Chapel Hill, North Carolina Navy Pre-Flight School. He died at the Brooklyn Naval Hospital.

In popular culture

Wirkus wrote an autobiographical account of his time in Haiti, with Taney Dudley and an introduction by William Seabrook, entitled The White King of La Gonave: The True Story of the Sergeant of Marines Who Was Crowned King on a Voodoo Island, published by Doubleday, Doran and Company, Inc. in 1931. Seabrook also published Wirkus' account of the occupation in his travel narrative, The Magic Island.

A 1933 featurette titled Voodoo produced by Sol Lesser featured Wirkus telling his story.

Wirkus is buried at Arlington National Cemetery in Virginia.

References

1896 births
1948 deaths
United States Marines
Monarchs of Haiti
20th-century monarchs in North America
Burials at Arlington National Cemetery
People from Pittston, Pennsylvania
American people of Polish descent
Monarchs who abdicated
Catholics from Pennsylvania
Military personnel from Pennsylvania

Nobility of the Americas